Maxime Musqua (born 27 July 1987) is a French comedian and actor. He was a columnist at the Petit Journal for one season between September 2013 and June 2014.

References 

1987 births
Living people
People from Talence
French television presenters
French male comedians